Anthocharis julia, the southern Rocky Mountain orangetip, is a butterfly found in the southern Rocky Mountains on the eastern side of the range. Their caterpillars feed on rock cress (Arabis) species. Adults feed on flower nectar from host plants as well as thistles, fiddleneck, and brodiaeas. Its habitats include foothill canyons and washes, usually in oak woodland, as well as forested riparian areas.

References

Anthocharis
Fauna of the Rocky Mountains
Butterflies of North America
Butterflies described in 1872
Taxa named by William Henry Edwards